Encephalartos tegulaneus, the Kenyan giant cycad, is a species of cycad endemic to Kenya. It occurs in Eastern Province near Embu, Kenya, and on the Matthews Range in Rift Valley Province.

E. tegulaneus ssp. powsii is critically endangered due to overcollecting and a very limited distribution. The other subspecies are not critically endangered.

Description
It is a cicada with an arborescent habit, with an erect or sometimes decumbent stem, up to 10 m high and with a diameter of 30–55 cm. 

The leaves, 120–180 cm long, are arranged in a crown at the apex of the stem and are supported by a 15-20 cm long petiole; they are composed of numerous pairs of lanceolate leaflets, with entire margins, on average 16–22 cm long, reduced to spines towards the base of the petiole.

It is a dioecious species with male specimens that have 3-6 subcylindrical cones, 40–50 cm long and 12–14 cm broad, of bright yellow color, and female specimens with 1-4 ovoid cones, 40–70 cm long and with diameter 19–30 cm, golden yellow in color.

References

External links
 
 

tegulaneus